Saint-Léonard—Saint-Michel (formerly Saint-Léonard) is a federal electoral district within the City of Montreal in Quebec, Canada, that has been represented in the House of Commons of Canada since 1988. Its population during the 2011 election was 108,811. The current member of parliament is Patricia Lattanzio who is the first woman to represent this riding since its creation and is also a member of the Liberal Party. This riding is one of the safest Liberal ridings in all of Canada having elected the last candidate with over 69% of the vote.

Geography
The district is located in the north eastern part of the island of Montreal. The district includes the entire borough of Saint Leonard, and the neighbourhood of Saint-Michel which is a part of the borough of Villeray–Saint-Michel–Parc-Extension and a small part of the borough of Rosemont–La Petite-Patrie lying northwesterly of Bélanger Street.

Demographics
According to the Canada 2021 Census

 Languages (2021 mother tongue) : 33.4% French, 17.0% Italian, 12.0% Arabic, 8.6% Spanish, 6.8% English, 6.2% Creole, 2.8% Vietnamese, 1.6% Kabyle, 1.4% Portuguese, 1.1% Khmer, 0.9% Cantonese, 0.9% Tamil,.0.8% Turkish, 0.5% Romanian, 0.5% Bengali, 0.4% Min Nan, 0.4% Mandarin, 0.3% Greek, 0.3% Polish, 0.3% Ukrainian

History

"Saint-Léonard" riding was first created in 1976 from parts of Maisonneuve—Rosemont, Mercier and Saint-Michel ridings. The name of the riding was changed in 1977 to Saint-Léonard—Anjou before an election was held. It consisted of the City of Saint-Léonard, the Town of Anjou, and part of the City of Montreal.

The neighbouring ridings are Rosemont—La Petite-Patrie, Papineau, Ahuntsic, Bourassa, Honoré-Mercier, and Hochelaga.

The current electoral district was created as "Saint-Léonard" riding in 1987 from parts of Gamelin and Saint-Léonard—Anjou ridings. In 1996, its name was changed to "Saint-Léonard—Saint-Michel" when its boundaries changed and now included part of the neighbourhood of Saint-Michel. 

This riding lost some territory to Papineau, and gained territory from Ahuntsic and Hochelaga during the 2012 electoral redistribution.

Members of Parliament

This riding has elected the following Members of Parliament:

Election results

Saint-Léonard—Saint-Michel, 1996-present

|align="left" colspan=2|Liberal hold
|align="right"|Swing
|align="right"| -0.3
|align="right"|

Saint-Léonard, 1987-1996

See also
 List of Canadian federal electoral districts
 Past Canadian electoral districts

References

Campaign expense data from Elections Canada
Riding history from the Library of Parliament
2011 Results from Elections Canada

Notes

Federal electoral districts of Montreal
Saint-Leonard, Quebec
Villeray–Saint-Michel–Parc-Extension
1987 establishments in Quebec